Stumpf or Stumpff is a surname. Notable people with the surname include:

 Carl Stumpf (1848–1936), German philosopher and psychologist
 Christian Stumpf (born 1966), Austrian international footballer
 Daniel Stumpf (born 1991), American baseball player
 Eddie Stumpf (1894-1978), American baseball player, manager and executive
 Horst Stumpff (1887–1958), German general in World War II
 Hulda Stumpf (1867–1930), American Christian missionary in Kenya
 István Stumpf (born 1957), Hungarian politician
 Johann Andreas Stumpff (1769–1846), German maker of harps and pianos, resident in London
 Johann Stumpf (engineer), German steam locomotive engineer, known for his work on uniflow steam engines.
 John Stumpf (born 1953), American business executive and investment banker
 Karl Stumpff (1895–1970), German astronomer
 Kenneth E. Stumpf (1944-2022), American United States Army soldier and recipient of the Congressional Medal of Honor
 Peter Stumpf, several people
 Tommi Stumpff (born 1958), German musician
 Wilhelm Stumpf (1873–1926), German painter and illustrator

See also
 Stumpf Field at McMinn Park, Pennsylvania, United States
 3105 Stumpff, a minor planet
 Stumph, a surname

Surnames from nicknames
German toponymic surnames